Amy Erica Smith (born 13 July 1976) is an American political scientist.

Education and academic career
Smith was born in Eugene, Oregon, and raised in Dallas, Texas. She earned a bachelor's degree in Latin American studies at the University of Texas at Austin, obtained a master's degree in city and regional planning at Cornell University, then pursued doctoral studies in political science at the University of Pittsburgh. Smith moved to Ames, Iowa, in 2012, and began teaching at Iowa State University as an assistant professor of political science. In 2018, she became an associate professor. Since 2019, Smith has served as a Liberal Arts and Sciences Dean's Professor.

Fellowships, awards, and honors
In 2014, Smith received a Fulbright Fellowship and was based in Brazil. From 2016 to 2017, she held a fellowship at the University of Notre Dame's Kellogg Institute for International Studies. In 2019, Smith was awarded a fellowship by the American Council of Learned Societies. Smith was awarded a Carnegie Fellowship in 2020. That same year, Smith was also a fellow of the Woodrow Wilson International Center for Scholars.

Political career
In November 2021, Smith was the leading vote-getter of three candidates elected to the Ames School Board.

Personal life
Smith is married to the Romanian-born software engineer and artist Tibi Chelcea. They first met in Pennsylvania, while he was employed by Carnegie Mellon University and she studied at the University of Pittsburgh. Chelcea began making art in the late 2000s, and is a member of the art collective Ames C.art. He helped organize an art exhibit during a sesquicentennial celebration marking the platting of Ames.

Smith speaks Spanish, Portuguese, and Romanian.

Selected publications

References

21st-century American politicians
21st-century American women politicians
Women in Iowa politics
School board members in Iowa
1976 births
Living people
Cornell University alumni
American political scientists
American women political scientists
Iowa State University faculty
21st-century American women writers
University of Texas at Austin alumni
University of Pittsburgh alumni
21st-century American non-fiction writers
ACLS Fellows
Writers from Eugene, Oregon
Writers from Dallas
Brazilianists